Timothy B. Hunter, better known as Tim Hunter, is an American radiologist and amateur astronomer, who was the president of the International Dark-Sky Association.

Education and profession 
Hunter received his M.D. degree from Northwestern University in 1968. He teaches as a professor of radiology and orthopaedic surgery at the University of Arizona College of Medicine. He also earned a B.S. degree in mathematics from the University of Arizona in 1980 and M.S. in astronomy from Swinburne University of Technology in 2006.

Astronomy 
Since 1986, Hunter has studied the problem of increasing light pollution. In 1987, together with David Crawford, he founded the International Dark-Sky Association, which has grown to more than 10,000 members in 75 countries (as of 2007). His effort in this field brought him the Presidential Award of the Astronomical League in 2004 and the Amateur Achievement Award of the Astronomical Society of the Pacific in 2005. He is also a member of the Planetary Science Institute Board of Trustees and a past chairman of the Western Region of the Astronomical League.

Asteroid 
Asteroid 6398 Timhunter, discovered by Carolyn Shoemaker at Palomar Observatory in 1991, was named in his honor. The official  was published by the Minor Planet Center on 1 June 1996.

References 
 

 2005 ASP Annual Award Winners: Tim Hunter
 University of Arizona - msk biographical sketches
 Planetary Science Institute Board of Trustees
 The Grasslands observatory
 6398 Timhunter at JPL Small-Body Database Browser

Living people
Amateur astronomers
20th-century American astronomers
21st-century American astronomers
University of Arizona faculty
University of Arizona alumni
Feinberg School of Medicine alumni
Year of birth missing (living people)